Drenovo is a small village located in the municipality of Makedonski Brod, North Macedonia.

History
During the Balkan wars, Serbian chetniks massacred 50 Albanian families in the village of Drenovo.

Demographics
In statistics gathered by Vasil Kanchov in 1900, the village of Drenovo was inhabited by 220 Muslim Albanians. 

According to the 2002 census, the village had a total of 33 inhabitants. Ethnic groups in the village include:

Macedonians 33

According to the 2021 census, the village had a total of 17 inhabitants. Ethnic groups in the village include:

Macedonians 16
Albanians 1

References

Villages in Makedonski Brod Municipality
Albanian communities in North Macedonia